Plybothris quadricollis is a Jewel Beetle of the Buprestidae family.

Description
This quite common species is one of the most colourful. Elytra have an olive green granular color, while the underside of the body shows an extremely bright metallic rainbow of colors.
The colours underside seems to be important for sexual recognition among different species within the genus.

Distribution
These beetles can be found in Madagascar.

References

quadricollis
Buprestidae
Beetles described in 1836